Mucin-5AC (MUC-5AC) is a protein that in humans is encoded by the MUC5AC gene.  

MUC-5AC is a large gel-forming glycoprotein. In the respiratory tract it protects against infection by binding to inhaled pathogens that are subsequently removed by mucociliary clearance. Overproduction of MUC-5AC can contribute to diseases such as asthma and chronic obstructive pulmonary disease, and has also been associated with greater protection against influenza infection.

Clinical relevance 

This gene has been linked to mucus hypersecretion in the respiratory tract and is associated to chronic obstructive pulmonary disease (COPD).

References

External links 
 PDBe-KB provides an overview of all the structure information available in the PDB for Human Mucin-5AC

05AC